The 130th (Lanark and Renfrew) Battalion, CEF was a unit in the Canadian Expeditionary Force during the First World War.  Based in Perth, Ontario, the unit began recruiting in late 1915 in Lanark and Renfrew Counties.  After sailing to England in September 1916, the battalion was absorbed into the 12th Reserve Battalion on October 6, 1916.  The 130th Battalion, CEF had one Officer Commanding: Lieut-Col. J. E. de Hertel.

130th Battalion (Lanark and Renfrew), CEF, is perpetuated by the 42nd Field Artillery Regiment (Lanark and Renfrew Scottish), RCA.

References

Meek, John F. Over the Top! The Canadian Infantry in the First World War. Orangeville, Ont.: The Author, 1971.

Battalions of the Canadian Expeditionary Force
Military units and formations of Ontario